The following television stations in the United States formerly branded as channel 19 (though neither using virtual channel 19 nor broadcasting on physical RF channel 19):
 WDBJ-DT2 in Roanoke, Virginia

19 branded